The 1988–89 Pittsburgh Penguins season saw the Penguins finish in second place in the Patrick Division with a record of 40 wins, 33 losses, and 7 ties for 87 points. They swept the New York Rangers in the Division Semi-finals before losing the Division Finals in seven games to the Philadelphia Flyers.

Offseason

Regular season
This was Mario Lemieux's best season offensively. He led the league in goals (85), assists (114, tied with Wayne Gretzky), points (199), power-play goals (31) and shorthanded goals (13).

The Penguins finished the regular season with the most power-play opportunities against, with 482, the most power-play opportunities, with 491, and the most power-play goals scored, with 119.

Highlights
 December 31, 1988 – Mario Lemieux scores five goals in an 8–6 win over the New Jersey Devils. Lemieux scores the five goals in five different ways: even strength, shorthanded, power play, penalty shot, and empty net.

Season standings

Schedule and results
On January 4, 1989, the Penguins defeated the Red Army team 4–2 at the Civic Arena in an exhibition. 

|- style="background:#cfc;"
| 1 || Oct 7 || || Pittsburgh Penguins || 6–4 || Washington Capitals || Capital Centre || 1–0–0 || 2
|- style="background:#cfc;"
| 2 || Oct 11 || || Washington Capitals || 7–8 || Pittsburgh Penguins || Civic Arena || 2–0–0 || 4
|- style="background:#fcf;"
| 3 || Oct 12 || || Pittsburgh Penguins || 5–8 || Buffalo Sabres || Buffalo Memorial Auditorium || 2–1–0 || 4
|- style="background:#cfc;"
| 4 || Oct 15 || || St. Louis Blues || 2–9 || Pittsburgh Penguins || Civic Arena || 3–1–0 || 6
|- style="background:#cfc;"
| 5 || Oct 18 || || Philadelphia Flyers || 2–4 || Pittsburgh Penguins || Civic Arena || 4–1–0 || 8
|- style="background:#fcf;"
| 6 || Oct 21 || || Pittsburgh Penguins || 4–6 || New Jersey Devils || Brendan Byrne Arena || 4–2–0 || 8
|- style="background:#cfc;"
| 7 || Oct 22 || || Chicago Blackhawks || 4–7 || Pittsburgh Penguins || Civic Arena || 5–2–0 || 10
|- style="background:#cfc;"
| 8 || Oct 25 || || Calgary Flames || 1–6 || Pittsburgh Penguins || Civic Arena || 6–2–0 || 12
|- style="background:#fcf;"
| 9 || Oct 27 || || Pittsburgh Penguins || 3–4 || St. Louis Blues || St. Louis Arena || 6–3–0 || 12
|- style="background:#cfc;"
| 10 || Oct 29 || || Pittsburgh Penguins || 5–4 || Montreal Canadiens || Montreal Forum || 7–3–0 || 14
|- style="background:#fcf;"
| 11 || Oct 30 || || Pittsburgh Penguins || 2–9 || New York Rangers || Madison Square Garden (IV) || 7–4–0 || 14
|-

|- style="background:#cfc;"
| 12 || Nov 1 || || Vancouver Canucks || 3–5 || Pittsburgh Penguins || Civic Arena || 8–4–0 || 16
|- style="background:#fcf;"
| 13 || Nov 3 || || Quebec Nordiques || 6–2 || Pittsburgh Penguins || Civic Arena || 8–5–0 || 16
|- style="background:#fcf;"
| 14 || Nov 6 || || Pittsburgh Penguins || 4–5 || Philadelphia Flyers || The Spectrum || 8–6–0 || 16
|- style="background:#fcf;"
| 15 || Nov 8 || || Edmonton Oilers || 7–3 || Pittsburgh Penguins || Civic Arena || 8–7–0 || 16
|- style="background:#cfc;"
| 16 || Nov 10 || || Toronto Maple Leafs || 1–5 || Pittsburgh Penguins || Civic Arena || 9–7–0 || 18
|- style="background:#fcf;"
| 17 || Nov 12 || || Pittsburgh Penguins || 2–7 || Los Angeles Kings || The Forum || 9–8–0 || 18
|- style="background:#cfc;"
| 18 || Nov 13 || || Pittsburgh Penguins || 4–2 || Vancouver Canucks || Pacific Coliseum || 10–8–0 || 20
|- style="background:#fcf;"
| 19 || Nov 16 || || Pittsburgh Penguins || 5–8 || Toronto Maple Leafs || Maple Leaf Gardens || 10–9–0 || 20
|- style="background:#fcf;"
| 20 || Nov 19 || || Pittsburgh Penguins || 3–6 || New York Islanders || Nassau Veterans Memorial Coliseum || 10–10–0 || 20
|- style="background:#cfc;"
| 21 || Nov 23 || || New York Rangers || 2–8 || Pittsburgh Penguins || Civic Arena || 11–10–0 || 22
|- style="background:#cfc;"
| 22 || Nov 25 || || Pittsburgh Penguins || 5–3 || Washington Capitals || Capital Centre || 12–10–0 || 24
|- style="background:#cfc;"
| 23 || Nov 26 || || Philadelphia Flyers || 3–4 || Pittsburgh Penguins || Civic Arena || 13–10–0 || 26
|- style="background:#cfc;"
| 24 || Nov 30 || || Washington Capitals || 4–6 || Pittsburgh Penguins || Civic Arena || 14–10–0 || 28
|-

|- style="background:#cfc;"
| 25 || Dec 3 || || New York Islanders || 2–4 || Pittsburgh Penguins || Civic Arena || 15–10–0 || 30
|- style="background:#ffc;"
| 26 || Dec 4 || || Pittsburgh Penguins || 3–3 OT || Boston Bruins || Boston Garden || 15–10–1 || 31
|- style="background:#cfc;"
| 27 || Dec 6 || || Chicago Blackhawks || 6–7 || Pittsburgh Penguins || Civic Arena || 16–10–1 || 33
|- style="background:#fcf;"
| 28 || Dec 8 || || Pittsburgh Penguins || 3–4 || Philadelphia Flyers || The Spectrum || 16–11–1 || 33
|- style="background:#ffc;"
| 29 || Dec 10 || || New Jersey Devils || 4–4 OT || Pittsburgh Penguins || Civic Arena || 16–11–2 || 34
|- style="background:#cfc;"
| 30 || Dec 14 || || Los Angeles Kings || 4–5 || Pittsburgh Penguins || Civic Arena || 17–11–2 || 36
|- style="background:#cfc;"
| 31 || Dec 15 || || Pittsburgh Penguins || 8–2 || New York Islanders || Nassau Veterans Memorial Coliseum || 18–11–2 || 38
|- style="background:#cfc;"
| 32 || Dec 17 || || Detroit Red Wings || 2–3 || Pittsburgh Penguins || Civic Arena || 19–11–2 || 40
|- style="background:#cfc;"
| 33 || Dec 20 || || New York Islanders || 3–5 || Pittsburgh Penguins || Civic Arena || 20–11–2 || 42
|- style="background:#cfc;"
| 34 || Dec 21 || || Pittsburgh Penguins || 6–1 || Toronto Maple Leafs || Maple Leaf Gardens || 21–11–2 || 44
|- style="background:#ffc;"
| 35 || Dec 23 || || Pittsburgh Penguins || 2–2 OT || New Jersey Devils || Brendan Byrne Arena || 21–11–3 || 45
|- style="background:#cfc;"
| 36 || Dec 26 || || Pittsburgh Penguins || 4–3 OT || Hartford Whalers || Hartford Civic Center || 22–11–3 || 47
|- style="background:#fcf;"
| 37 || Dec 29 || || Philadelphia Flyers || 3–2 || Pittsburgh Penguins || Civic Arena || 22–12–3 || 47
|- style="background:#cfc;"
| 38 || Dec 31 || || New Jersey Devils || 6–8 || Pittsburgh Penguins || Civic Arena || 23–12–3 || 49
|-

|- style="background:#fcf;"
| 39 || Jan 2 || || Pittsburgh Penguins || 0–8 || Washington Capitals || Capital Centre || 23–13–3 || 49
|- style="background:#fcf;"
| 40 || Jan 7 || || Vancouver Canucks || 7–5 || Pittsburgh Penguins || Civic Arena || 23–14–3 || 49
|- style="background:#cfc;"
| 41 || Jan 10 || || New York Islanders || 3–5 || Pittsburgh Penguins || Civic Arena || 24–14–3 || 51
|- style="background:#cfc;"
| 42 || Jan 12 || || Pittsburgh Penguins || 9–2 || Minnesota North Stars || Met Center || 25–14–3 || 53
|- style="background:#ffc;"
| 43 || Jan 14 || || New York Rangers || 4–4 OT || Pittsburgh Penguins || Civic Arena || 25–14–4 || 54
|- style="background:#fcf;"
| 44 || Jan 15 || || Pittsburgh Penguins || 4–6 || New York Rangers || Madison Square Garden (IV) || 25–15–4 || 54
|- style="background:#fcf;"
| 45 || Jan 17 || || Pittsburgh Penguins || 2–5 || New York Islanders || Nassau Veterans Memorial Coliseum || 25–16–4 || 54
|- style="background:#fcf;"
| 46 || Jan 20 || || Pittsburgh Penguins || 3–7 || Winnipeg Jets || Winnipeg Arena || 25–17–4 || 54
|- style="background:#cfc;"
| 47 || Jan 21 || || Pittsburgh Penguins || 7–4 || Edmonton Oilers || Northlands Coliseum || 26–17–4 || 56
|- style="background:#cfc;"
| 48 || Jan 25 || || Winnipeg Jets || 4–5 || Pittsburgh Penguins || Civic Arena || 27–17–4 || 58
|- style="background:#cfc;"
| 49 || Jan 28 || || Detroit Red Wings || 5–10 || Pittsburgh Penguins || Civic Arena || 28–17–4 || 60
|- style="background:#fcf;"
| 50 || Jan 31 || || Montreal Canadiens || 5–1 || Pittsburgh Penguins || Civic Arena || 28–18–4 || 60
|-

|- style="background:#cfc;"
| 51 || Feb 2 || || Pittsburgh Penguins || 5–3 || Philadelphia Flyers || The Spectrum || 29–18–4 || 62
|- style="background:#ffc;"
| 52 || Feb 3 || || St. Louis Blues || 3–3 OT || Pittsburgh Penguins || Civic Arena || 29–18–5 || 63
|- style="background:#cfc;"
| 53 || Feb 5 || || Pittsburgh Penguins || 5–2 || Boston Bruins || Boston Garden || 30–18–5 || 65
|- style="background:#cfc;"
| 54 || Feb 9 || || Quebec Nordiques || 2–5 || Pittsburgh Penguins || Civic Arena || 31–18–5 || 67
|- style="background:#fcf;"
| 55 || Feb 11 || || Pittsburgh Penguins || 1–8 || Quebec Nordiques || Colisée de Québec || 31–19–5 || 67
|- style="background:#fcf;"
| 56 || Feb 12 || || Calgary Flames || 4–2 || Pittsburgh Penguins || Civic Arena || 31–20–5 || 67
|- style="background:#cfc;"
| 57 || Feb 14 || || Buffalo Sabres || 3–7 || Pittsburgh Penguins || Civic Arena || 32–20–5 || 69
|- style="background:#fcf;"
| 58 || Feb 17 || || Pittsburgh Penguins || 1–5 || Buffalo Sabres || Buffalo Memorial Auditorium || 32–21–5 || 69
|- style="background:#fcf;"
| 59 || Feb 18 || || New York Rangers || 5–3 || Pittsburgh Penguins || Civic Arena || 32–22–5 || 69
|- style="background:#fcf;"
| 60 || Feb 21 || || Minnesota North Stars || 2–1 || Pittsburgh Penguins || Civic Arena || 32–23–5 || 69
|- style="background:#ffc;"
| 61 || Feb 23 || || Pittsburgh Penguins || 6–6 OT || Detroit Red Wings || Joe Louis Arena || 32–23–6 || 70
|- style="background:#ffc;"
| 62 || Feb 25 || || Pittsburgh Penguins || 5–5 OT || New York Islanders || Nassau Veterans Memorial Coliseum || 32–23–7 || 71
|- style="background:#fcf;"
| 63 || Feb 26 || || Pittsburgh Penguins || 6–8 || Hartford Whalers || Hartford Civic Center || 32–24–7 || 71
|-

|- style="background:#cfc;"
| 64 || Mar 1 || || New Jersey Devils || 1–4 || Pittsburgh Penguins || Civic Arena || 33–24–7 || 73
|- style="background:#fcf;"
| 65 || Mar 3 || || Pittsburgh Penguins || 2–4 || Washington Capitals || Capital Centre || 33–25–7 || 73
|- style="background:#fcf;"
| 66 || Mar 5 || || Edmonton Oilers || 4–2 || Pittsburgh Penguins || Civic Arena || 33–26–7 || 73
|- style="background:#fcf;"
| 67 || Mar 7 || || Pittsburgh Penguins || 2–3 OT || Los Angeles Kings || Great Western Forum || 33–27–7 || 73
|- style="background:#fcf;"
| 68 || Mar 9 || || Pittsburgh Penguins || 3–10 || Calgary Flames || Olympic Saddledome || 33–28–7 || 73
|- style="background:#cfc;"
| 69 || Mar 10 || || Pittsburgh Penguins || 5–1 || Winnipeg Jets || Winnipeg Arena || 34–28–7 || 75
|- style="background:#cfc;"
| 70 || Mar 12 || || Pittsburgh Penguins || 6–5 || Chicago Blackhawks || Chicago Stadium || 35–28–7 || 77
|- style="background:#fcf;"
| 71 || Mar 14 || || Boston Bruins || 8–2 || Pittsburgh Penguins || Civic Arena || 35–29–7 || 77
|- style="background:#cfc;"
| 72 || Mar 16 || || Pittsburgh Penguins || 2–1 || New Jersey Devils || Brendan Byrne Arena || 36–29–7 || 79
|- style="background:#fcf;"
| 73 || Mar 18 || || Montreal Canadiens || 7–2 || Pittsburgh Penguins || Civic Arena || 36–30–7 || 79
|- style="background:#fcf;"
| 74 || Mar 20 || || Pittsburgh Penguins || 2–7 || Minnesota North Stars || Met Center || 36–31–7 || 79
|- style="background:#fcf;"
| 75 || Mar 22 || || Washington Capitals || 5–4 || Pittsburgh Penguins || Civic Arena || 36–32–7 || 79
|- style="background:#cfc;"
| 76 || Mar 25 || || New Jersey Devils || 4–5 || Pittsburgh Penguins || Civic Arena || 37–32–7 || 81
|- style="background:#cfc;"
| 77 || Mar 26 || || Pittsburgh Penguins || 6–4 || New York Rangers || Madison Square Garden (IV) || 38–32–7 || 83
|- style="background:#fcf;"
| 78 || Mar 30 || || Hartford Whalers || 9–5 || Pittsburgh Penguins || Civic Arena || 38–33–7 || 83
|-

|- style="background:#cfc;"
| 79 || Apr 1 || || New York Rangers || 2–5 || Pittsburgh Penguins || Civic Arena || 39–33–7 || 85
|- style="background:#cfc;"
| 80 || Apr 2 || || Pittsburgh Penguins || 6–5 OT || Philadelphia Flyers || The Spectrum || 40–33–7 || 87
|-

|- style="text-align:center;"
| Legend:       = Win       = Loss       = Tie

Playoffs

After six frustrating and disappointing seasons, the Penguins finally managed to get into the playoffs for the first time since the 1981–82 season. They swept New York Rangers in the Semifinals, but lost to their rivals, the Philadelphia Flyers in seven games.

Playoff log

|- style="background:#cfc;"
| 1 || April 5||N.Y. Rangers||1–3||Pittsburgh|| ||Coffey (2),Quinn||Sandstrom||Barrasso (1–0)||16,025||1–0||
|- style="background:#cfc;"
| 2 || April 6||N.Y. Rangers||4–7||Pittsburgh|| ||Stevens, Brown, Callander, Bourque,Cunneyworth, Zalapski, Lemieux (en)||Lafleur, Leetch, Ogrodnick, Wilson||Barrasso (2–0)||16,025||2–0||
|- style="background:#cfc;"
| 3 || April 8||Pittsburgh||5–3||N.Y. Rangers|| ||Lemeiux, Cullen, Stevens,Quinn (2) ||Granato, Ogrodnick, Sandstrom||Barrasso (3–0)||17,498||3–0||
|- style="background:#cff;"
| 4 || April 9||Pittsburgh||4–3||N.Y. Rangers|| ||Lemieux, Bourque,Brown ||Sandstrom, Leetch (2) ||Barrasso (4–0)||17,403||4–0||
|-

|- style="background:#cfc;"
| 1 || April 17||Philadelphia||3–4||Pittsburgh|| ||Lemieux, Quinn, Cullen,Brown||Poulin, Kerr, Propp||Barrasso (5–0)||16,025||1–0||
|- style="background:#fcf;"
| 2 || April 19||Philadelphia||4–2||Pittsburgh|| ||Quinn, Lemieux||Kerr (3),Propp||Barrasso (5–1)||16,025||1–1||
|- style="background:#cfc;"
| 3 || April 21||Pittsburgh||4–3||Philadelphia||12:08||Lemieux, Quinn, Callander,Bourque||Poulin, Acton, Propp||Barrasso (6–1)||17,423||2–1||
|- style="background:#fcf;"
| 4 || April 23||Pittsburgh||1–4||Philadelphia|| ||Cullen||Poulin,Kerr (2), Carkner||Barrasso (6–2)||17,423||2–2||
|- style="background:#cfc;"
| 5 || April 25||Philadelphia||7–10||Pittsburgh|| ||Lemieux (3), Errey, Lemieux, Loney,Stevens, Brown (2), Lemieux (en)||Bullard, Eklund, Propp, Smith, Kerr, Eklund, Kerr||Barrasso (7–2)||16,025||3–2||
|- style="background:#fcf;"
| 6 || April 27||Pittsburgh||2–6||Philadelphia|| ||Cunneyworth (2)||Kerr (2),Smith, Sutter, Smith, Propp||Barrasso (7–3)||17,423||3–3||
|- style="background:#fcf;"
| 7 || April 29||Philadelphia||4–1||Pittsburgh|| ||Lemieux||Propp,Poulin, Bullard, Mellanby (en)||Barrasso (7–4)||16,025||3–4||
|-

|-
| ''Legend:       = Win       = Loss       = Playoff series win

Player statistics
Skaters

Goaltenders

†Denotes player spent time with another team before joining the Penguins.  Stats reflect time with the Penguins only.
‡Denotes player was traded mid-season.  Stats reflect time with the Penguins only.

Awards and records
 Paul Coffey, Defence, NHL First All-Star Team
 Mario Lemieux, Center, NHL First All-Star Team
 Mario Lemieux, Art Ross Trophy
 Mario Lemieux, Center, NHL First All-Star Team
 Mario Lemieux became the first person to score 100 assists in a season for the Penguins. He did so in a 6–8 loss to Hartford on February 26.
 Mario Lemieux became the first person to score 170 points in a season for the Penguins. He did so in a 2–3 loss to Los Angeles on March 7.
 Mario Lemieux became the first person to score 180 points in a season for the Penguins. He did so in a 2–8 loss to Boston on March 14.
 Mario Lemieux became the first person to score 110 assists in a season for the Penguins. He did so in a 2–7 loss to Minnesota on March 20.
 Mario Lemieux became the first person to score 190 points in a season for the Penguins. He did so in a 6–4 win over New York on March 27.
 Mario Lemieux became the first person to score 80 goals in a season for the Penguins. He did so in a 5–9 loss to Hartford on March 30.
 Mario Lemieux became the first person to score 400 assists for the Penguins. He did so in a 6–8 loss to Hartford on February 26.
 Mario Lemieux became the first person to score 700 points for the Penguins. He did so in a 4–5 loss to Washington on March 22.
 Mario Lemieux established a new franchise record for goals (85), assists (114) and points (199) in a season. He had set all three records the previous season.
 Mario Lemieux established a new franchise record for assists (415) and points (715). He broke the previous records of 349 assists (Syl Apps Jr.) and 636 points (Rick Kehoe)
 Paul Coffey established a new franchise record for goals (30), assists (83) and points (113) in a season by a defenseman. He broke the records of 16 goals, 67 assists and 83 points all set by Randy Carlyle in 1981.
 Rod Buskas established a new franchise record for penalty minutes (946). He broke the previous records of 871 PIM held by Bryan Watson.
 Mario Lemieux established a new franchise record for highest plus-minus in a season (+41). He broke the previous high of +36 set by Lowell MacDonald in 1973.
 Mario Lemieux, NHL Record, Most Shorthanded Goals, One Season (13)

Transactions

Trades

Free agents lost

Waiver Draft

Player signings

Other

Draft picks

Pittsburgh Penguins' picks at the 1988 NHL Entry Draft.

Draft notes
 The Pittsburgh Penguins' third-round pick went to the Montreal Canadiens as the result of a December 17, 1987, trade that sent Perry Ganchar and future considerations (1988 third-round pick (#62-Daniel Gauthier)) to the Penguins in exchange for a future considerations (this pick).
 The Montreal Canadiens' third-round pick went to the Pittsburgh Penguins as a result of a December 17, 1987, trade that sent future considerations (1988 third-round pick (#46-Neil Carnes)) to the Canadiens in exchange for Perry Ganchar and future considerations (this pick).
 The Pittsburgh Penguins' sixth-round pick went to the Los Angeles Kings as the result of a February 4, 1988, trade that sent Bryan Erickson to the Penguins in exchange for Chris Kontos and future considerations (this pick).

References
 Penguins on Hockey Database

Pitts
Pitts
Pittsburgh Penguins seasons
Pitts
Pitts